Thubactis TV is a Libyan television channel launched on July 23, 2011.
Thubactis channel pledges to operate neutrally, without any political or governmental influence.
Among its successes, Thubactis TV creates animated short films about Libya's new political system.
The name Thubactis refers to the old Roman name of Misurata. The channel is carried on Nilesat 11258 H 27500 5/6.

Television stations in Libya
2011 establishments in Libya